Acraea cuva, the chic acraea, is a butterfly in the family Nymphalidae. It is found along the coast of Kenya and Tanzania and in Malawi, Mozambique and eastern Zimbabwe.

Description
Very similar to Acraea dammii qv. for diagnosis

Biology
The habitat probably consists of forests.

Both sexes feed from the flowers of Lantana species.

Taxonomy
It is a member of the Acraea terpsicore species group -   but see also Pierre & Bernaud, 2014

References

External links

 Die Gross-Schmetterlinge der Erde 13: Die Afrikanischen Tagfalter. Plate XIII 57 a 
Images representing Acraea cuva at Bold

Butterflies described in 1889
cuva
Butterflies of Africa
Taxa named by Henley Grose-Smith